Manichaeism (
in New Persian) is a former major religion founded in the 3rd century AD by the Parthian prophet Mani (AD 216–274), in the Sasanian Empire.

Manichaeism teaches an elaborate dualistic cosmology describing the struggle between a good, spiritual world of light, and an evil, material world of darkness. Through an ongoing process that takes place in human history, light is gradually removed from the world of matter and returned to the world of light, whence it came. Its beliefs are based on local Mesopotamian religious movements and Gnosticism. It reveres Mani as the final prophet after Zoroaster, Gautama Buddha, and Jesus.

Manichaeism was quickly successful and spread far through the Aramaic-speaking regions. It thrived between the third and seventh centuries, and at its height was one of the most widespread religions in the world. Manichaean churches and scriptures existed as far east as China and as far west as the Roman Empire. It was briefly the main rival to Christianity in the competition to replace classical polytheism before the spread of Islam. Under the Roman Dominate, Manichaeism was persecuted by the Roman state and was eventually stamped out in the Roman Empire.

Manichaeism has survived longer in the east than it did in the west. Although it was thought to have finally faded away after the 14th century in south China, contemporary to the decline of the Church of the East in Ming China, there is a growing corpus of evidence that shows Manichaeism persists in some areas of China, especially in Fujian province, where numerous Manichaean relics have been discovered over time. The currently known sects are notably secretive and protective of their belief system, which has aided in them going relatively undetected. This stems from fears relating to persecution and suppression during various periods of Chinese history.

While most of Manichaeism's original writings have been lost, numerous translations and fragmentary texts have survived.

An adherent of Manichaeism is called a Manichaean or Manichean, or Manichee, especially in older sources.

History

Life of Mani 

Mani was an Iranian, born in 216 in or near Seleucia-Ctesiphon (now al-Mada'in) in the Parthian Empire. According to the Cologne Mani-Codex, Mani's parents were members of the Jewish Christian Gnostic sect known as the Elcesaites.

Mani composed seven works, six of which were written in the Syriac language, a late variety of Aramaic. The seventh, the Shabuhragan, was written by Mani in Middle Persian and presented by him to the Sasanian emperor, Shapur I. Although there is no proof Shapur I was a Manichaean, he tolerated the spread of Manichaeism and refrained from persecuting it within his empire's boundaries.

According to one tradition, Mani invented the unique version of the Syriac script known as the Manichaean alphabet, which was used in all of the Manichaean works written within the Sasanian Empire, whether they were in Syriac or Middle Persian, and also for most of the works written within the Uyghur Khaganate. The primary language of Babylon (and the administrative and cultural language of the Sassanid Empire) at that time was Eastern Middle Aramaic, which included three main dialects: Jewish Babylonian Aramaic (the language of the Babylonian Talmud), Mandaean (the language of Mandaeism), and Syriac, which was the language of Mani, as well as of the Syriac Christians.

While Manichaeism was spreading, existing religions such as Zoroastrianism were still popular and Christianity was gaining social and political influence. Although having fewer adherents, Manichaeism won the support of many high-ranking political figures. With the assistance of the Sasanian Empire, Mani began missionary expeditions. After failing to win the favour of the next generation of Persian royalty, and incurring the disapproval of the Zoroastrian clergy, Mani is reported to have died in prison awaiting execution by the Persian Emperor Bahram I. The date of his death is estimated at 276–277.

Influences 

Mani believed that the teachings of Gautama Buddha, Zoroaster, and Jesus were incomplete, and that his revelations were for the entire world, calling his teachings the "Religion of Light". Manichaean writings indicate that Mani received revelations when he was 12 and again when he was 24, and over this period he grew dissatisfied with the Elcesaite sect he was born into.

Mani wore colorful clothing abnormal for the time that made Romans think of a Persian magician or warlord, earning him ire from the Greco-Roman world because of it.

Mani taught how the soul of the righteous returns to Paradise whereas the soul of the person who persisted in things of the flesh – fornication, procreation, possessions, cultivation, harvesting, eating of meat, drinking of wine – is condemned to rebirth in a succession of bodies.

Mani began preaching at an early age and was possibly influenced by contemporary Babylonian-Aramaic movements such as Mandaeism, and Aramaic translations of Jewish apocalyptic writings similar to those found at Qumran (such as the book of Enoch literature), and by the Syriac dualist-gnostic writer Bardaisan (who lived a generation before Mani). With the discovery of the Mani-Codex, it also became clear that he was raised in a Jewish-Christian baptism sect, the Elcesaites, and was possibly influenced by their writings, as well.

According to biographies preserved by Ibn al-Nadim and the Persian polymath al-Biruni, he received a revelation as a youth from a spirit, whom he would later call his Twin (from which is also derived the name of Thomas the Apostle, the "twin"), his Syzygos ( "spouse, partner", in the Cologne Mani-Codex), his Double, his Protective Angel or Divine Self. It taught him truths that he developed into a religion. His divine Twin or true Self brought Mani to self-realization. He claimed to be the Paraclete of the Truth, as promised by Jesus in the New Testament.

Manichaeism's views on Jesus are described by historians:

Augustine of Hippo also noted that Mani declared himself to be an "apostle of Jesus Christ". Manichaean tradition is also noted to have claimed that Mani was the reincarnation of different religious figures such as Buddha, Krishna, Zoroaster, and Jesus.

Academics also note that much of what is known about Manichaeism comes from later 10th- and 11th-century Muslim historians like Al-Biruni and especially ibn al-Nadim (and his Fihrist), who "ascribed to Mani the claim to be the Seal of the Prophets." However, given the Islamic milieu of Arabia and Persia at the time, it stands to reason that Manichaens would regularly assert in their evangelism that Mani, not Muhammad, was the "Seal of the Prophets". In reality, for Mani the metaphorical expression "Seal of Prophets" is not a reference to his finality in a long succession of prophets, as it is in Islam, but, rather to his followers, who testify or attest his message, as a seal does.

Another source of Mani's scriptures was original Aramaic writings relating to the Book of Enoch literature (see the Book of Enoch and the Second Book of Enoch), as well as an otherwise unknown section of the Book of Enoch called The Book of Giants. This book was quoted directly, and expanded on by Mani, becoming one of the original six Syriac writings of the Manichaean Church. Besides brief references by non-Manichaean authors through the centuries, no original sources of The Book of Giants (which is actually part six of the Book of Enoch) were available until the 20th century.

Scattered fragments of both the original Aramaic "Book of Giants" (which were analyzed and published by Józef Milik in 1976) and of the Manichaean version of the same name (analyzed and published by Walter Bruno Henning in 1943) were found with the discovery in the twentieth century of the Dead Sea Scrolls in the Judaean Desert and the Manichaean writings of the Uyghur Manichaean kingdom in Turpan. Henning wrote in his analysis of them:

By comparing the cosmology in the Book of Enoch literature and the Book of Giants, alongside the description of the Manichaean myth, scholars have observed that the Manichaean cosmology can be described as being based, in part, on the description of the cosmology developed in detail in the Book of Enoch literature. This literature describes the being that the prophets saw in their ascent to heaven, as a king who sits on a throne at the highest of the heavens. In the Manichaean description, this being, the "Great King of Honor", becomes a deity who guards the entrance to the world of light, placed at the seventh of ten heavens. In the Aramaic Book of Enoch, in the Qumran writings in general, and in the original Syriac section of Manichaean scriptures quoted by Theodore bar Konai, he is called "malka raba de-ikara" (the Great King of Honor).

Mani was also influenced by writings of the Assyrian gnostic Bardaisan (154–222), who, like Mani, wrote in Syriac, and presented a dualistic interpretation of the world in terms of light and darkness, in combination with elements from Christianity.

Noting Mani's travels to the Kushan Empire (several religious paintings in Bamyan are attributed to him) at the beginning of his proselytizing career, Richard Foltz postulates Buddhist influences in Manichaeism:

The Kushan monk Lokakṣema began translating Pure Land Buddhist texts into Chinese in the century prior to Mani arriving there, and the Chinese texts of Manichaeism are full of uniquely Buddhist terms taken directly from these Chinese Pure Land scriptures, including the term "pure land" (淨土 Jìngtǔ) itself. However, the central object of veneration in Pure Land Buddhism, Amitābha, the Buddha of Infinite Light, does not appear in Chinese Manichaeism, and seems to have been replaced by another deity.

Spread

Roman Empire

Manichaeism reached Rome through the apostle Psattiq by 280, who was also in Egypt in 244 and 251. It was flourishing in the Faiyum in 290.

Manichaean monasteries existed in Rome in 312 during the time of Pope Miltiades.

In 291, persecution arose in the Sasanian Empire with the murder of the apostle Sisin by Emperor Bahram II and the slaughter of many Manichaeans. Then, in 302, the first official reaction and legislation against Manichaeism from the Roman state to Manichaeism was issued under Diocletian. In an official edict called the De Maleficiis et Manichaeis compiled in the Collatio Legum Mosaicarum et Romanarum and addressed to the proconsul of Africa, Diocletian wrote

We have heard that the Manichaeans [...] have set up new and hitherto unheard-of sects in opposition to the older creeds so that they might cast out the doctrines vouchsafed to us in the past by the divine favour for the benefit of their own depraved doctrine. They have sprung forth very recently like new and unexpected monstrosities among the race of the Persians – a nation still hostile to us – and have made their way into our empire, where they are committing many outrages, disturbing the tranquility of our people and even inflicting grave damage to the civic communities. We have cause to fear that with the passage of time they will endeavour, as usually happens, to infect the modest and tranquil of an innocent nature with the damnable customs and perverse laws of the Persians as with the poison of a malignant (serpent) ... We order that the authors and leaders of these sects be subjected to severe punishment, and, together with their abominable writings, burnt in the flames. We direct their followers, if they continue recalcitrant, shall suffer capital punishment, and their goods be forfeited to the imperial treasury. And if those who have gone over to that hitherto unheard-of, scandalous and wholly infamous creed, or to that of the Persians, are persons who hold public office, or are of any rank or of superior social status, you will see to it that their estates are confiscated and the offenders sent to the (quarry) at Phaeno or the mines at Proconnesus. And in order that this plague of iniquity shall be completely extirpated from this our most happy age, let your devotion hasten to carry out our orders and commands.

By 354, Hilary of Poitiers wrote that Manichaeism was a significant force in Roman Gaul. In 381, Christians requested Theodosius I to strip Manichaeans of their civil rights. Starting in 382, the emperor issued a series of edicts to suppress Manichaeism and punish its followers.

Augustine of Hippo (354–430) converted to Christianity from Manichaeism in the year 387. This was shortly after the Roman emperor Theodosius I had issued a decree of death for all Manichaean monks in 382 and shortly before he declared Christianity to be the only legitimate religion for the Roman Empire in 391. Due to the heavy persecution, the religion almost disappeared from western Europe in the fifth century and from the eastern portion of the empire in the sixth century.

According to his Confessions, after nine or ten years of adhering to the Manichaean faith as a member of the group of "hearers", Augustine became a Christian and a potent adversary of Manichaeism (which he expressed in writing against his Manichaean opponent Faustus of Mileve), seeing their beliefs that knowledge was the key to salvation as too passive and not able to effect any change in one's life.

Some modern scholars have suggested that Manichaean ways of thinking influenced the development of some of Augustine's ideas, such as the nature of good and evil, the idea of hell, the separation of groups into elect, hearers, and sinners, and the hostility to the flesh and sexual activity, and his dualistic theology.

Central Asia

Some Sogdians in Central Asia believed in the religion. Uyghur khagan Boku Tekin (759–780) converted to the religion in 763 after a three-day discussion with its preachers, the Babylonian headquarters sent high rank clerics to Uyghur, and Manichaeism remained the state religion for about a century before the collapse of the Uyghur Khaganate in 840.

China
In the east it spread along trade routes as far as Chang'an, the capital of Tang China.

After the Tang Dynasty, some Manichaean groups participated in peasant movements. The religion was used by many rebel leaders to mobilise followers. In the Song and Yuan dynasties of China remnants of Manichaeism continued to leave a legacy contributing to sects such as the Red Turbans. During the Song Dynasty, the Manichaeans were derogatorily referred by the Chinese as chicai simo (meaning that they "abstain from meat and worship demons").

An account in Fozu Tongji, an important historiography of Buddhism in China compiled by Buddhist scholars during 1258–1269, says that the Manichaeans worshipped the "white Buddha" and their leader wore a violet headgear, while the followers wore white costumes. Many Manichaeans took part in rebellions against the Song government and were eventually quelled. After that, all governments were suppressive against Manichaeism and its followers and the religion was banned by the Ming Dynasty in 1370.  While it had long been thought that Manichaeism arrived in China only at the end of the seventh century, a recent archaeological discovery demonstrated that it was already known there in the second half of the 6th century.

Tibet
Manichaeism spread to Tibet during the Tibetan Empire. There was likely a serious attempt to introduce the religion to the Tibetans as the text Criteria of the Authentic Scriptures (a text attributed to Tibetan Emperor Trisong Detsen) makes a great effort to attack Manichaeism by stating that Mani was a heretic who took ideas from all faiths and blended them together into a deviating and inauthentic form.

Iran
Manichaeans in Iran tried to assimilate their religion along with Islam in the Muslim caliphates. Relatively little is known about the religion during the first century of Islamic rule. During the early caliphates, Manichaeism attracted many followers. It had a significant appeal among the Muslim society, especially among the elites. Due to the appeal of its teachings, many Muslims adopted the ideas of its theology and some even became dualists. An apologia for Manichaeism ascribed to ibn al-Muqaffa' defended its phantasmagorical cosmogony and attacked the fideism of Islam and other monotheistic religions. The Manichaeans had sufficient structure to have a head of their community.

Arab world
Under the eighth-century Abbasid Caliphate, Arabic  and the adjectival term  could denote many different things, though it seems primarily (or at least initially) to have signified a follower of Manichaeism, however its true meaning is not known. In the ninth century, it is reported that Caliph al-Ma'mun tolerated a community of Manichaeans.

During the early Abbasid period, the Manichaeans underwent persecution. The third Abbasid caliph, al-Mahdi, persecuted the Manichaeans, establishing an inquisition against dualists who if being found guilty of heresy refused to renounce their beliefs, were executed. Their persecution was finally ended in 780s by Harun al-Rashid. During the reign of the Caliph al-Muqtadir, many Manichaeans fled from Mesopotamia to Khorasan from fear of persecution and the base of the religion was later shifted to Samarkand.

Syncretism and translation 
Manichaeism claimed to present the complete version of teachings that were corrupted and misinterpreted by the followers of its predecessors Adam, Zoroaster, Buddha and Jesus. Accordingly, as it spread, it adapted new deities from other religions into forms it could use for its scriptures. Its original Aramaic texts already contained stories of Jesus.

When they moved eastward and were translated into Iranian languages, the names of the Manichaean deities (or angels) were often transformed into the names of Zoroastrian yazatas. Thus Abbā dəRabbūṯā ("The Father of Greatness", the highest Manichaean deity of Light), in Middle Persian texts might either be translated literally as pīd ī wuzurgīh, or substituted with the name of the deity Zurwān.

Similarly, the Manichaean primal figure Nāšā Qaḏmāyā "The Original Man" was rendered Ohrmazd Bay, after the Zoroastrian god Ohrmazd. This process continued in Manichaeism's meeting with Chinese Buddhism, where, for example, the original Aramaic  qaryā (the "call" from the World of Light to those seeking rescue from the World of Darkness), becomes identified in the Chinese scriptures with Guanyin ( or Avalokiteśvara in Sanskrit, literally, "watching/perceiving sounds [of the world]", the bodhisattva of Compassion).

Manichaeism influenced some writing and traditions of proto-orthodox and other forms of Christianity, Zoroastrianism, Judaism, Buddhism, and Islam.

Persecution and suppression 

Manichaeism was repressed by the Sasanian Empire. In 291, persecution arose in the Persian empire with the murder of the apostle Sisin by Bahram II, and the slaughter of many Manichaeans. In 296, the Roman emperor Diocletian decreed all the Manichaean leaders to be burnt alive along with the Manichaean scriptures and many Manichaeans in Europe and North Africa were killed. It was not until 372 with Valentinian I and Valens that Manichaeism was legislated against again.

Theodosius I issued a decree of death for all Manichaean monks in 382 AD. The religion was vigorously attacked and persecuted by both the Christian Church and the Roman state, and the religion almost disappeared from western Europe in the fifth century and from the eastern portion of the empire in the sixth century.

In 732, Emperor Xuanzong of Tang banned any Chinese from converting to the religion, saying it was a heretic religion that was confusing people by claiming to be Buddhism. However, the foreigners who followed the religion were allowed to practice it without punishment. After the fall of the Uyghur Khaganate in 840, which was the chief patron of Manichaeism (which was also the state religion of the Khaganate) in China, all Manichaean temples in China except in the two capitals and Taiyuan were closed down and never reopened since these temples were viewed as a symbol of foreign arrogance by the Chinese (see Cao'an). Even those that were allowed to remain open did not for long.

The Manichaean temples were attacked by Chinese people who burned the images and idols of these temples. Manichaean priests were ordered to wear hanfu instead of their traditional clothing, which was viewed as un-Chinese. In 843, Emperor Wuzong of Tang gave the order to kill all Manichaean clerics as part of his Great Anti-Buddhist Persecution, and over half died. They were made to look like Buddhists by the authorities, their heads were shaved, they were made to dress like Buddhist monks and then killed.

Although the religion was mostly forbidden and its followers persecuted thereafter in China, it survives within syncretic sects throughout Fujian in a form of Chinese Manichaeism also called Mingjiao.  Under the Song dynasty, its followers were derogatorily referred to with the chengyu  "vegetarian demon-worshippers".

Many Manichaeans took part in rebellions against the Song dynasty. They were quelled by Song China and were suppressed and persecuted by all successive governments before the Mongol Yuan dynasty. In 1370, the religion was banned through an edict of the Ming dynasty, whose Hongwu Emperor had a personal dislike for the religion. Its core teaching influences many religious sects in China, including the White Lotus movement.

According to Wendy Doniger, Manichaeism may have continued to exist in the modern-East Turkestan region until the Mongol conquest in the 13th century.

Manicheans also suffered persecution for some time under the Abbasid Caliphate of Baghdad. In 780, the third Abbasid Caliph, al-Mahdi, started a campaign of inquisition against those who were "dualist heretics" or "Manichaeans" called the zindīq. He appointed a "master of the heretics", an official whose task was to pursue and investigate suspected dualists, who were then examined by the Caliph. Those found guilty who refused to abjure their beliefs were executed.

This persecution continued under his successor, Caliph al-Hadi, and continued for some time during reign of Harun al-Rashid, who finally abolished it and ended it. During the reign of the 18th Abbasid Caliph al-Muqtadir, many Manichaeans fled from Mesopotamia to Khorasan from fear of persecution by him and about 500 of them assembled in Samarkand. The base of the religion was later shifted to this city, which became their new Patriarchate.

Manichaean pamphlets were still in circulation in Greek in 9th-century Byzantine Constantinople, as the patriarch Photios summarizes and discusses one that he has read by Agapius in his Bibliotheca.

Later movements associated with Manichaeism 
During the Middle Ages, several movements emerged that were collectively described as "Manichaean" by the Catholic Church, and persecuted as Christian heresies through the establishment of the Inquisition in 1184. They included the Cathar churches of Western Europe. Other groups sometimes referred to as "neo-Manichaean" were the Paulician movement, which arose in Armenia, and the Bogomils in Bulgaria. An example of this usage can be found in the published edition of the Latin Cathar text, the Liber de duobus principiis (Book of the Two Principles), which was described as "Neo-Manichaean" by its publishers. As there is no presence of Manichaean mythology or church terminology in the writings of these groups, there has been some dispute among historians as to whether these groups were descendants of Manichaeism.

Manichaeism could have influenced the Bogomils, Paulicians, and Cathars. However, these groups left few records, and the link between them and Manichaeans is tenuous. Regardless of its accuracy, the charge of Manichaeism was leveled at them by contemporary orthodox opponents, who often tried to make contemporary heresies conform to those combatted by the church fathers.

Whether the dualism of the Paulicians, Bogomils, and Cathars and their belief that the world was created by a Satanic demiurge were due to influence from Manichaeism is impossible to determine. The Cathars apparently adopted the Manichaean principles of church organization. Priscillian and his followers may also have been influenced by Manichaeism. The Manichaeans preserved many apocryphal Christian works, such as the Acts of Thomas, that would otherwise have been lost.

Present day 
Some sites are preserved in Xinjiang and Fujian in China. The Cao'an temple is the most widely known, and best preserved Manichaean building, though it later became associated with Buddhism. 

Chinese Manichaeans continue to practice the faith.

Teachings and beliefs

General 
Mani's teaching dealt with the origin of evil, by addressing a theoretical part of the problem of evil by denying the omnipotence of God and postulating two opposite powers. Manichaean theology taught a dualistic view of good and evil. A key belief in Manichaeism is that the powerful, though not omnipotent good power (God), was opposed by the eternal evil power (devil). Humanity, the world, and the soul are seen as the by-product of the battle between God's proxy, Primal Man, and the devil.

The human person is seen as a battle-ground for these powers: the soul defines the person, but it is under the influence of both light and dark. This contention plays out over the world as well as the human body—neither the Earth nor the flesh were seen as intrinsically evil, but rather possessed portions of both light and dark. Natural phenomena (such as rain) were seen as the physical manifestation of this spiritual contention. Therefore, the Manichaean view explained the existence of evil by positing a flawed creation in the formation of which God took no part and which constituted rather the product of a battle by the devil against God.

Cosmogony 

Manichaeism presented an elaborate description of the conflict between the spiritual world of light and the material world of darkness. The beings of both the world of darkness and the world of light have names. There are numerous sources for the details of the Manichaean belief. There are two portions of Manichaean scriptures that are probably the closest thing to the original Manichaean writings in their original languages that will ever be available. These are the Syriac-Aramaic quotation by the Nestorian Christian Theodore bar Konai, in his Syriac "Book of Scholia" (Ketba de-Skolionz, 8th century), and the Middle Persian sections of Mani's Shabuhragan discovered at Turpan (a summary of Mani's teachings prepared for Shapur I).

From these and other sources, it is possible to derive an almost complete description of the detailed Manichaean vision (a complete list of Manichaean deities is outlined below). According to Mani, the unfolding of the universe takes place with three "creations":

 The First Creation
 Originally, good and evil existed in two completely separate realms, one the World of Light, ruled by the Father of Greatness together with his five Shekhinas (divine attributes of light), and the other the World of Darkness, ruled by the King of Darkness. At a certain point, the Kingdom of Darkness notices the World of Light, becomes greedy for it and attacks it. The Father of Greatness, in the first of three "creations" (or "calls"), calls to the Mother of Life, who sends her son Original Man, to battle with the attacking powers of Darkness, which include the Demon of Greed. The Original Man is armed with five different shields of light (reflections of the five Shekhinas), which he loses to the forces of darkness in the ensuing battle, described as a kind of "bait" to trick the forces of darkness, as the forces of darkness greedily consume as much light as they can. When the Original Man comes to, he is trapped among the forces of darkness.

 The Second Creation
 Then the Father of Greatness begins the Second Creation, calling to the Living Spirit, who calls to his five sons, and sends a call to the Original Man (Call then becomes a Manichaean deity). An answer (Answer becomes another Manichaean deity) then returns from the Original Man to the World of Light. The Mother of Life, the Living Spirit, and his five sons begin to create the universe from the bodies of the evil beings of the World of Darkness, together with the light that they have swallowed. Ten heavens and eight earths are created, all consisting of various mixtures of the evil material beings from the World of Darkness and the swallowed light. The sun, moon, and stars are all created from light recovered from the World of Darkness. The waxing and waning of the moon is described as the moon filling with light, which passes to the sun, then through the Milky Way, and eventually back to the World of Light.

 The Third Creation
 Great demons (called archons in bar-Khonai's account) are hung out over the heavens, and then the Father of Greatness begins the Third Creation. Light is recovered from out of the material bodies of the male and female evil beings and demons, by causing them to become sexually aroused in greed, towards beautiful images of the beings of light, such as the Third Messenger and the Virgins of Light. However, as soon as the light is expelled from their bodies and falls to the earth (some in the form of abortions – the source of fallen angels in the Manichaean myth), the evil beings continue to swallow up as much of it as they can to keep the light inside of them. This results eventually in the evil beings swallowing huge quantities of light, copulating, and producing Adam and Eve. The Father of Greatness then sends the Radiant Jesus to awaken Adam, and to enlighten him to the true source of the light that is trapped in his material body. Adam and Eve, however, eventually copulate, and produce more human beings, trapping the light in bodies of mankind throughout human history. The appearance of the Prophet Mani was another attempt by the World of Light to reveal to mankind the true source of the spiritual light imprisoned within their material bodies.

Outline of the beings and events in the Manichaean mythology 
Beginning with the time of its creation by Mani, the Manichaean religion had a detailed description of deities and events that took place within the Manichaean scheme of the universe. In every language and region that Manichaeism spread to, these same deities reappear, whether it is in the original Syriac quoted by Theodore bar Konai, or the Latin terminology given by Saint Augustine from Mani's Epistola Fundamenti, or the Persian and Chinese translations found as Manichaeism spread eastward. While the original Syriac retained the original description that Mani created, the transformation of the deities through other languages and cultures produced incarnations of the deities not implied in the original Syriac writings. Chinese translations were especially syncretic, borrowing and adapting terminology common in Chinese Buddhism.

The World of Light 
 The Father of Greatness (Syriac:  Abbā dəRabbūṯā; Middle Persian: pīd ī wuzurgīh, or the Zoroastrian deity Zurwān; Parthian: Pidar wuzurgift, Pidar roshn;  or  )
 His Four Faces
 Divinity (Middle Persian: yzd; Parthian: bg’)
 Light (Middle Persian and Parthian: rwšn)
 Power (Middle Persian: zwr; Parthian: z’wr’)
 Wisdom (Middle Persian: whyh; Parthian: jyryft’)
 His Five Shekhinas (Syriac:  khamesh shkhinatei;):

 The Great Spirit (Middle Persian: Waxsh zindag, Waxsh yozdahr; Latin: Spiritus Potens)

The first creation 
 The Mother of Life ( imā dəḥayyē;)
 First Enthymesis
 His five Sons (the five Light Elements; ;)
 Ether
 Wind (Parthian and)
 Light (Parthian and)
 Water (Parthian and)
 Fire (Parthian and)
The answer sent by the First Man to the Call from the World of Light.

The second creation 
 The Friend of the Lights ( ḥaviv nehirē) Calls to:
 The Great Builder ( ban rabbā) In charge of creating the new world that will separate the darkness from the light. He calls to:
 The Living Spirit ( ruḥā ḥayyā; ; ;). Acts as a demiurge, creating the structure of the material world.
 His five Sons ( ḥamšā benawhy)
 The Keeper of the Splendour ( ṣfat ziwā;). Holds up the ten heavens from above.
 The King of Glory ( mlex šuvḥā; ;  Dìzàng "Earth Treasury", a Chinese bodhisattva).
 The Adamas of Light ( adamus nuhrā;). Fights with and overcomes an evil being in the image of the King of Darkness.
 The Great King of Honour ( malkā rabbā dikkārā; Dead Sea Scrolls  malka raba de-ikara;). A being that plays a central role in The Book of Enoch (originally written in Aramaic), as well as Mani's Syriac version of it, the Book of Giants. Sits in the seventh heaven of the ten heavens (corresponding to the celestial spheres, the first seven of which house the classical planets) and guards the entrance to the world of light.
 Atlas ( sebblā;). Supports the eight worlds from below.
 His sixth Son, the Call-God ( qaryā; ;  Guanyin "watching/perceiving sounds [of the world]", the Chinese Bodhisattva of Compassion). Sent from the Living Spirit to awaken the First Man from his battle with the forces of darkness.

The third creation 
 Jesus the Splendour ( Isho Ziwā;  or  ). Sent to awaken Adam and Eve to the source of the spiritual light trapped within their physical bodies.
 The Twelve Virgins of Light ( tratesrā btultē;). Reflected in the twelve constellations of the Zodiac.
The path that souls take back to the World of Light; corresponds to the Milky Way.
 The Great Nous
 His five Limbs (See "His Five Shekhinas" above.)
 Reason
 Mind
 Intelligence
 Thought
 Understanding
 The Just Judge
 The Last God

The World of Darkness 
 The Prince of Darkness (Syriac:  mlex ḥešoxā; Middle Persian: Ahriman, the Zoroastrian supreme evil being)
 His five evil kingdoms Evil counterparts of the five elements of light, the lowest being the kingdom of Darkness.
 His son (Syriac:  Ashaklun; Middle Persian: Az, from the Zoroastrian demon, Aži Dahāka)
 His son's mate (Syriac:  Nevro'el)
 Their offspring – Adam and Eve (Middle Persian: Gehmurd and Murdiyanag)
 Giants (Fallen Angels, also Abortions): (Syriac:  yaḥtē, "abortions" or "those that fell";;  Egrēgoroi, "Giants"). Related to the story of the fallen angels in the Book of Enoch (which Mani used extensively in The Book of Giants), and the  nephilim described in Genesis (6:1–4).

The Manichaean Church

Organization 
The Manichaean Church was divided into the Elect, who had taken upon themselves the vows of Manichaeism, and the Hearers, those who had not, but still participated in the Church. The Elect were forbidden to consume alcohol and meat, as well as to harvest crops or prepare food, due to Mani's claim that harvesting was a form of murder against plants. The Hearers would therefore commit the sin of preparing food, and would provide it to the Elect, who would in turn pray for the Hearers and cleanse them of these sins.

The terms for these divisions were already common since the days of early Christianity, however, it had a different meaning in Christianity. In Chinese writings, the Middle Persian and Parthian terms are transcribed phonetically (instead of being translated into Chinese). These were recorded by Augustine of Hippo.
 The Leader (Syriac: ܟܗܢܐ ; Parthian: yamag), Mani's designated successor, seated as Patriarch at the head of the Church, originally in Ctesiphon, from the ninth century in Samarkand. Two notable leaders were Mār Sīsin (or Sisinnios), the first successor of Mani, and Abū Hilāl al-Dayhūri, an eighth-century leader.
 12 Apostles (Latin: magistrī; Syriac: ܫܠܝܚܐ ; Middle Persian: možag). Three of Mani's original apostles were Mār Pattī (Pattikios; Mani's father), Akouas and Mar Ammo.
One of Mani's original disciples who was specifically referred to as a bishop was Mār Addā.
 360 Presbyters (Latin: presbyterī; Syriac: ܩܫܝܫܐ ; Middle Persian: mahistan)
 The general body of the Elect (Latin: ēlēctī; Syriac: ܡܫܡܫܢܐ ; Middle Persian: ardawan or dēnāwar;  or )
 The Hearers (Latin: audītōrēs; Syriac: ܫܡܘܥܐ ; Middle Persian: niyoshagan)

Religious practices

Prayers 
Evidently from Manichaean sources, Manichaeans observed daily prayers, either four for the hearers or seven for the elect. The sources differ about the exact time of prayer. The Fihrist by al-Nadim, points them after noon, mid-afternoon, just after sunset and at nightfall. Al-Biruni places the prayers at dawn, sunrise, noon, and nightfall. The elect additionally pray at mid-afternoon, half an hour after nightfall and at midnight. Al-Nadim's account of daily prayers is probably adjusted to coincide with the public prayers for the Muslims, while Al-Birunis report may reflect an older tradition unaffected by Islam.

When Al-Nadim's account of daily prayers had been the only detailed source available, there was a concern that these practises had been only adapted by Muslims during the Abbasid Caliphate. However, it is clear that the Arabic text provided by Al-Nadim corresponds with the descriptions of Egyptian texts from the fourth century.

Every prayer started with an ablution with water or, if water was not available, with other substances comparable to ablution in Islam and consisted of several blessings to the apostles and spirits. The prayer consisted of prostrating oneself to the ground and rising again twelve times during every prayer. During day, Manichaeans turned towards the sun and during night towards the moon. If the moon is not visible at night, they turned towards north.

Evident from Faustus of Mileve, Celestial bodies are not the subject of worship themselves, but are "ships" carrying the light particles of the world to the supreme god, who can not be seen, since he exists beyond time and space, and also the dwelling places for emanations of the supreme deity, such as Jesus the Splendour. According to the writings of Augustine of Hippo, ten prayers were performed, the first devoted to the Father of Greatness, and the following to lesser deities, spirits and angels and finally towards the elect, in order to be freed from rebirth and pain and to attain peace in the realm of light. Comparable, in the Uighur confession, four prayers are directed to the supreme God (Äzrua), the God of the Sun and the Moon, and fivefold God and the buddhas.

Primary sources 

Mani wrote seven books, which contained the teachings of the religion. Only scattered fragments and translations of the originals remain, most having been discovered in Egypt and Turkistan during the 20th century.

The original six Syriac writings are not preserved, although their Syriac names have been. There are also fragments and quotations from them. A long quotation, preserved by the eighth-century Nestorian Christian author Theodore Bar Konai, shows that in the original Syriac Aramaic writings of Mani there was no influence of Iranian or Zoroastrian terms. The terms for the Manichaean deities in the original Syriac writings are in Aramaic. The adaptation of Manichaeism to the Zoroastrian religion appears to have begun in Mani's lifetime however, with his writing of the Middle Persian Shabuhragan, his book dedicated to the Sasanian emperor, Shapur I.

In it, there are mentions of Zoroastrian divinities such as Ahura Mazda, Angra Mainyu, and Āz. Manichaeism is often presented as a Persian religion, mostly due to the vast number of Middle Persian, Parthian, and Sogdian (as well as Turkish) texts discovered by German researchers near Turpan in what is now Xinjiang, China, during the early 1900s. However, from the vantage point of its original Syriac descriptions (as quoted by Theodore Bar Khonai and outlined above), Manichaeism may be better described as a unique phenomenon of Aramaic Babylonia, occurring in proximity to two other new Aramaic religious phenomena, Talmudic Judaism and Mandaeism, which also appeared in Babylonia in roughly the third century.

The original, but now lost, six sacred books of Manichaeism were composed in Syriac Aramaic, and translated into other languages to help spread the religion. As they spread to the east, the Manichaean writings passed through Middle Persian, Parthian, Sogdian, Tocharian, and ultimately Uyghur and Chinese translations. As they spread to the west, they were translated into Greek, Coptic, and Latin.

Henning describes how this translation process evolved and influenced the Manichaeans of Central Asia:

Originally written in Syriac 
 the Gospel of Mani (Syriac: ܐܘܢܓܠܝܘܢ ;  "good news, gospel"). Quotations from the first chapter were brought in Arabic by ibn al-Nadim, who lived in Baghdad at a time when there were still Manichaeans living there, in his 938 book, the Fihrist, a catalog of all written books known to him.
 The Treasure of Life
 The Treatise (Coptic: πραγματεία, pragmateia)
 Secrets
 The Book of Giants: Original fragments were discovered at Qumran (pre-Manichaean) and Turpan.
 Epistles: Augustine brings quotations, in Latin, from Mani's Fundamental Epistle in some of his anti-Manichaean works.
 Psalms and Prayers: A Coptic Manichaean Psalter, discovered in Egypt in the early 1900s, was edited and published by Charles Allberry from Manichaean manuscripts in the Chester Beatty collection and in the Berlin Academy, 1938–9.

Originally written in Middle Persian 
 The Shabuhragan, dedicated to Shapur I: Original Middle Persian fragments were discovered at Turpan, quotations were brought in Arabic by al-Biruni.

Other books 
 The Ardahang, the "Picture Book". In Iranian tradition, this was one of Mani's holy books that became remembered in later Persian history, and was also called Aržang, a Parthian word meaning "Worthy", and was beautified with paintings. Therefore, Iranians gave him the title of "The Painter".
 The Kephalaia of the Teacher, "Discourses", found in Coptic translation.
 On the Origin of His Body, the title of the Cologne Mani-Codex, a Greek translation of an Aramaic book that describes the early life of Mani.

Non-Manichaean works preserved by the Manichaean Church
 Portions of the Book of Enoch literature such as the Book of Giants
 Literature relating to the apostle Thomas (who by tradition went to India, and was also venerated in Syria), such as portions of the Syriac The Acts of Thomas, and the Psalms of Thomas. The Gospel of Thomas was also attributed to Manichaeans by Cyril of Jerusalem, a fourth-century Church Father.
 The legend of Barlaam and Josaphat passed from an Indian story about the Buddha, through a Manichaean version, before it transformed into the story of a Christian Saint in the west.

Later works 

In later centuries, as Manichaeism passed through eastern Persian-speaking lands and arrived at the Uyghur Khaganate (回鶻帝國), and eventually the Uyghur kingdom of Turpan (destroyed around 1335), Middle Persian and Parthian prayers (āfrīwan or āfurišn) and the Parthian hymn-cycles (the Huwīdagmān and Angad Rōšnan created by Mar Ammo) were added to the Manichaean writings. A translation of a collection of these produced the Manichaean Chinese Hymnscroll (which Lieu translates as "Hymns for the Lower Section [i.e. the Hearers] of the Manichaean Religion").

In addition to containing hymns attributed to Mani, it contains prayers attributed to Mani's earliest disciples, including Mār Zaku, Mār Ammo and Mār Sīsin. Another Chinese work is a complete translation of the Sermon of the Light Nous, presented as a discussion between Mani and his disciple Adda.

Critical and polemic sources 
Until discoveries in the 1900s of original sources, the only sources for Manichaeism were descriptions and quotations from non-Manichaean authors, either Christian, Muslim, Buddhist, or Zoroastrian ones. While often criticizing Manichaeism, they also quoted directly from Manichaean scriptures. This enabled Isaac de Beausobre, writing in the 18th century, to create a comprehensive work on Manichaeism, relying solely on anti-Manichaean sources. Thus quotations and descriptions in Greek and Arabic have long been known to scholars, as have the long quotations in Latin by Saint Augustine, and the extremely important quotation in Syriac by Theodore Bar Konai.

Patristic depictions of Mani and Manichaeism 
Eusebius commented as follows:

Acta Archelai 
An example of how inaccurate some of these accounts could be can be seen in the account of the origins of Manichaeism contained in the Acta Archelai. This was a Greek anti-Manichaean work written before 348, most well known in its Latin version, which was regarded as an accurate account of Manichaeism until refuted by Isaac de Beausobre in the 18th century:

In the time of the Apostles there lived a man named Scythianus, who is described as coming "from Scythia", and also as being "a Saracen by race" ("ex genere Saracenorum"). He settled in Egypt, where he became acquainted with "the wisdom of the Egyptians", and invented the religious system that was afterwards known as Manichaeism. Finally he emigrated to Palestine, and, when he died, his writings passed into the hands of his sole disciple, a certain Terebinthus. The latter betook himself to Babylonia, assumed the name of Budda, and endeavoured to propagate his master's teaching. But he, like Scythianus, gained only one disciple, who was an old woman. After a while he died, in consequence of a fall from the roof of a house, and the books that he had inherited from Scythianus became the property of the old woman, who, on her death, bequeathed them to a young man named Corbicius, who had been her slave. Corbicius thereupon changed his name to Manes, studied the writings of Scythianus, and began to teach the doctrines that they contained, with many additions of his own. He gained three disciples, named Thomas, Addas, and Hermas. About this time the son of the Persian king fell ill, and Manes undertook to cure him; the prince, however, died, whereupon Manes was thrown into prison. He succeeded in escaping, but eventually fell into the hands of the king, by whose order he was flayed, and his corpse was hung up at the city gate.

A. A. Bevan, who quoted this story, commented that it "has no claim to be considered historical".

View of Judaism in the Acta Archelai 
According to Hegemonius' portrayal of Mani, the evil demiurge who created the world was the Jewish Jehovah. Hegemonius reports that Mani said,

Central Asian and Iranian primary sources 
In the early 1900s, original Manichaean writings started to come to light when German scholars led by Albert Grünwedel, and then by Albert von Le Coq, began excavating at Gaochang, the ancient site of the Manichaean Uyghur Kingdom near Turpan, in Chinese Turkestan (destroyed around AD 1300). While most of the writings they uncovered were in very poor condition, there were still hundreds of pages of Manichaean scriptures, written in three Iranian languages (Middle Persian, Parthian, and Sogdian) and old Uyghur. These writings were taken back to Germany and were analyzed and published at the Prussian Academy of Sciences in Berlin, by Le Coq and others, such as Friedrich W. K. Müller and Walter Bruno Henning. While the vast majority of these writings were written in a version of the Syriac script known as Manichaean script, the German researchers, perhaps for lack of suitable fonts, published most of them using the Hebrew alphabet (which could easily be substituted for the 22 Syriac letters).

More than any other research work published before or since, this work printed, and then discussed, the original key Manichaean texts in the original scripts, and consists chiefly of sections from Chinese texts, and Middle Persian and Parthian texts transcribed with the Hebrew alphabet. After the Nazi Party gained power in Germany, the Manichaean writings continued to be published during the 1930s, but the publishers no longer used Hebrew letters, instead transliterating the texts into Latin letters.

Coptic primary sources 
Additionally, in 1930, German researchers in Egypt found a large body of Manichaean works in Coptic. Though these were also damaged, hundreds of complete pages survived and, beginning in 1933, were analyzed and published in Berlin before World War II, by German scholars such as Hans Jakob Polotsky. Some of these Coptic Manichaean writings were lost during the war.

Chinese primary sources 
After the success of the German researchers, French scholars visited China and discovered what is perhaps the most complete set of Manichaean writings, written in Chinese. These three Chinese writings, all found at the Mogao Caves among the Dunhuang manuscripts, and all written before the 9th century, are today kept in London, Paris, and Beijing. Some of the scholars involved with their initial discovery and publication were Édouard Chavannes, Paul Pelliot, and Aurel Stein. The original studies and analyses of these writings, along with their translations, first appeared in French, English, and German, before and after World War II. The complete Chinese texts themselves were first published in Tokyo, Japan in 1927, in the Taishō Tripiṭaka, volume 54. While in the last thirty years or so they have been republished in both Germany (with a complete translation into German, alongside the 1927 Japanese edition), and China, the Japanese publication remains the standard reference for the Chinese texts.

Greek life of Mani, Cologne codex 
In Egypt, a small codex was found and became known through antique dealers in Cairo. It was purchased by the University of Cologne in 1969. The ancient papyrus manuscript contained a Greek text describing the life of Mani. Thanks to this discovery, much more is known about the man who founded one of the most influential world religions of the past.

Figurative use 
The terms "Manichaean" and "Manichaeism" are sometimes used figuratively as a synonym of the more general term "dualist" with respect to a philosophy, outlook, or world-view. The terms are often used to suggest that the world-view in question simplistically reduces the world to a struggle between good and evil. For example, Zbigniew Brzezinski used the phrase "Manichaean paranoia" in reference to U.S. President George W. Bush's world-view (in The Daily Show with Jon Stewart, 14 March 2007); Brzezinski elaborated that he meant "the notion that he [Bush] is leading the forces of good against the 'Axis of evil.'" Author and journalist Glenn Greenwald followed up on the theme in describing Bush in his book A Tragic Legacy (2007).

The term is frequently used by critics to describe the attitudes and foreign policies of the United States and its leaders.

Philosopher Frantz Fanon frequently invoked the concept of Manicheanism in his discussions of violence between colonizers and the colonized.

In My Secret History, author Paul Theroux's protagonist defines the word Manichaean for the protagonist's son as "seeing that good and evil are mingled." Before explaining the word to his son, the protagonist mentions Joseph Conrad's short story "The Secret Sharer" at least twice in the book, the plot of which also examines the idea of the duality of good and evil.

See also

Notes

References

Bibliography 

 Baker-Brian, Nicholas J. (2011). Manichaeism: An Ancient Faith Rediscovered. London and New York. T&T Clark. 
 
 
 
 
 
 
 
 
 
 
  (Cahiers D'Orientalism XVI) 1988a
  (Cahiers D'Orientalism XVI) 1988b.
Grousset, Rene (1939), tr. Walford, Naomi (1970), The Empire of the Steppes: A History of Central Asia, New Brunswick, N.J.: Rutgers..
  (Original Manichaean manuscripts found since 1902 in China, Egypt, Turkestan to be seen in the Museum of Indian Art in Berlin.)
 Heinrichs, Albert; Ludwig Koenen, Ein griechischer Mani-Kodex, 1970 (ed.) Der Kölner Mani-Codex ( P. Colon. Inv. nr. 4780), 1975–1982.
 La Vaissière, Etienne de, "Mani en Chine au VIe siècle", Journal Asiatique, 293–1, 2005, p. 357–378.
  reprinted in two volumes bound as one
 
 
 Mani (216–276/7) and his 'biography': the Codex Manichaicus Coloniensis (CMC):
 
 
 
 Towers, Susanna (2019). Constructions of Gender in Late Antique Manichaean Cosmological Narrative. Brepols. Turnhout.

Further reading
Scheftelowitz, J. Is Manicheism an Iranic Religion? Part I. 1924.

External links

Outside articles 
 Catholic Encyclopedia – Manichæism public domain, published 1917.
 International Association of Manichaean Studies
 Manichaean and Christian Remains in Zayton (Quanzhou, South China)
 Religions of Iran: Manichaeism by I.J.S. Taraporewala
 专题研究–摩尼教研究 
 《光明皇帝》明尊教背景书(1)

Manichaean sources in English translation 
 A summary of the Manichaean creation myth
 Manichaean Writings
 Manicheism. Complete bibliography and selection of Manichaean source texts in PDF format:
 A thorough bibliography and outline of Manichaean Studies
 A number of key Manichaean texts in English translation
 The Book of the Giants by W.B. Henning, 1943
 Nag Hammadi and Manichaean Studies (NHMS) series from Brill (various volumes containing English translations of Manichaean texts)

Secondary Manichaean sources in English translation 
 St. Augustine Against the Fundamental Epistle of Manichaeus
 Acta Archelai

Manichaean sources in their original languages 
 Photos of the Entire Koeln Mani-Kodex (Greek).
 The Syriac Manichaean work quoted by Theodor bar Khonai
 Photos of the Original Middle Persian Manichaean Writings/Fragments Discovered at Turpan (The index of this German site can be searched for additional Manichaean material, including photos of the original Chinese Manichaean writings)
 "Sermon of the Soul", in Parthian and Sogdian 
 Middle Persian and Parthian Texts
 D. N. MacKenzie, Mani's Šābuhragān, pt. 1 (text and translation), BSOAS 42/3, 1979, pp. 500–34, pt. 2 (glossary and plates), BSOAS 43/2, 1980, pp. 288–310 .
 Chinese Manichaean Scriptures: 摩尼教殘經一 ("Incomplete Sutra one of Manichaeism") & 摩尼光佛教法儀略("The Mani Bright Buddha teaching plan") & 下部讚("The Lower Part Praises")

Secondary Manichaean sources in their original languages 
 Augustine's Contra Epistolam Manichaei (Latin)

 
Gnosticism
Heresy in ancient Christianity
Iranian religions
Religion in China
Religion in the Sasanian Empire
Elcesaites